Slimeballs was a short lived middle-grade series of books by U. B. Gross, the pseudonym of Catherine Clark. They were generally humorous, in a similar vein to Grossology, Barf-O-Rama, and the Gooflumps parodies. The series is considered relatively obscure.

Complete List & Book Descriptions
 Fun Gus and Polly Pus
When Gus gets athlete's foot, he bites off his fingernails to distract himself from itching. Soon green fungus and white puffballs are exploding all around him. At the doctor's office, he meets Polly, who is covered in green goo from scratching her pus-filled poison ivy. These putrid pals are the grossest kids ever!

 Fun Gus Slimes the Bus
Nurse Gillette crashed and burned as school nurse, but now she's back as the gas-guzzling, bug juice slurping school bus driver. Her big foot planted firmly on the pedal, Gillette hijacks Gus's class for a joyride to Crudd Caverns... where the Rot rules. Rot's the scariest fungus ever!

 The Slithers Buy a Boa
Meet the Slithers — a family with a bit of a slob prob! Raging rodents are lunching on leftovers in their dirty den, and the Slithers realize they need an exterminator. The solution? Bucky, a boa constrictor with a big appetite. But digesting mouse lumps causes snake slowdown, and for a while Bucky's the ultimate cage potato. Until the peckish pet needs a fresh supply. Time to visit the neighbors!

References

1995 children's books
Children's fiction books
Series of children's books
American children's books